Parsnip Peak Wilderness is a  wilderness in northeastern Lincoln County, Nevada. It received wilderness status in 2004.

The area, which lies within the Wilson Creek Range, contains prehistoric sites, including the Mount Wilson Archaeological District. Its vegetation includes aspen groves, grasslands, mountain mahogany, and sagebrush, and it serves as a habitat for elk, mule deer, and raptors, including the northern goshawk.

References
Parsnip Peak Wilderness - Wilderness Connect
Parsnip Peak Wilderness - Friends of Nevada Wilderness
SEC. 203. ADDITIONS TO NATIONAL WILDERNESS PRESERVATION SYSTEM. House Report 108-720 - LINCOLN COUNTY CONSERVATION, RECREATION, AND DEVELOPMENT ACT OF 2004.
Parsnip Peak Wilderness - Proposed. State of Nevada.

IUCN Category Ib
Protected areas of Lincoln County, Nevada
Wilderness areas of Nevada
Bureau of Land Management areas in Nevada